Bromopentacarbonylrhenium(I) is an inorganic compound of rhenium, commonly used for the syntheses of other rhenium complexes.

Preparation
Bromopentacarbonylrhenium(I) is commercially available. It is also easily and inexpensively synthesized by the oxidation of dirhenium decacarbonyl with bromine:

Re2(CO)10 + Br2 → 2 ReBr(CO)5

It was first prepared by the "reductive carbonylation" of rhenium(III) bromide:

ReBr3  +  2 Cu  +  5 CO   →  BrRe(CO)5  +  2 CuBr

Copper(I) bromide is a byproduct.

Reactions
Bromopentacarbonylrhenium(I) is a precursor to other rhenium complexes. It reacts with zinc and acetic acid to give pentacarbonylhydridorhenium (HRe(CO)5).
 Re(CO)5Br + Zn + HO2CCH3  →   ReH(CO)5  +  ZnBrO2CCH3

It also reacts with tetraethylammonium bromide in diglyme to give [NEt4]2[ReBr3(CO)3)], an important precursor to compounds containing the rhenium tricarbonyl fragment.

Heating bromopentacarbonylrhenium(I) in water give the triaquo complex:

ReBr(CO)5 + 3 H2O → [Re(H2O)3(CO)3]Br + 2 CO

This route avoids the formation of the tetraethylammonium bromide byproduct, which is often difficult to remove from reaction mixtures.

References

Organorhenium compounds
Carbonyl complexes
Bromo complexes